Tylototriton is a genus of newts known as crocodile newts or knobby newts. About 36 known species are in this genus. Many species have been described just recently. They range from northeastern India and Nepal through Burma to northern Thailand, Laos, Vietnam, and southern China.

Species
36 species recognized as of April 2022:

Tylototriton anguliceps Le, Nguyen, Nishikawa, Nguyen, Pham, Matsui, Bernardes, and Nguyen, 2015
Tylototriton anhuiensis Qian, Sun, Li, Guo, Pan, Kang, Wang, Jiang, Wu, and Zhang, 2017
Tylototriton asperrimus Unterstein, 1930
Tylototriton broadoridgus Shen, Jiang, and Mo, 2012
Tylototriton dabienicus Chen, Wang, and Tao, 2010
Tylototriton daloushanensis Zhou, Xiao, and Luo, 2022
Tylototriton hainanensis Fei, Ye, and Yang, 1984
Tylototriton himalayanus Khatiwada, Wang, Ghimire, Vasudevan, Paudel, and Jiang, 2015
Tylototriton kachinorum Zaw, Lay, Pawangkhanant, Gorin, and Poyarkov, 2019
Tylototriton kweichowensis Fang and Chang, 1932
Tylototriton liuyangensis Yang, Jiang, Shen, and Fei, 2014
Tylototriton lizhengchangi Hou, Zhang, Jiang, Li and Lu, 2012
Tylototriton maolanensis Li, Wei, Cheng, Zhang, and Wang, 2020
Tylototriton ngarsuensis Grismer, Wood, Quah, Thura, Espinoza, Grismer, Murdoch, and Lin, 2018
Tylototriton notialis Stuart, Phimmachak, Sivongxay, and Robichaud, 2010
Tylototriton panhai Nishikawa, Khonsue, Pomchote, and Matsui, 2013
Tylototriton panwaensis Grismer, Wood, Quah, Thura, Espinoza, and Murdoch, 2019
Tylototriton pasmansi Bernardes, Le, Nguyen, Pham, Pham, Nguyen, and Ziegler, 2020
Tylototriton phukhaensis Pomchote, Khonsue, Thammachoti, Hernandez, Peerachidacho, Suwannapoom, Onishi, and Nishikawa, 2020
Tylototriton podichthys Phimmachak, Aowphol, and Stuart, 2015
Tylototriton pseudoverrucosus Hou, Gu, Zhang, Zeng, and Lu, 2012
Tylototriton pulcherrimus Hou, Zhang, Li, and Lu, 2012
Tylototriton shanjing Nussbaum, Brodie, and Yang, 1995
Tylototriton shanorum Nishikawa, Matsui, and Rao, 2014
Tylototriton sini Lyu, Wang, Zeng, Zhou, Qi, Wan, and Wang, 2021
Tylototriton sparreboomi Bernardes, Le, Nguyen, Pham, Pham, Nguyen, and Ziegler, 2020
Tylototriton taliangensis Liu, 1950
Tylototriton thaiorum Poyarkov, Nguyen, and Arkhipov, 2021
Tylototriton tongziensis Li, Liu, Shi, Wei, and Wang, 2022
Tylototriton umphangensis Pomchote, Peerachidacho, Hernandez, Sapewisut, Khonsue, Thammachoti, and Nishikawa, 2021
Tylototriton uyenoi Nishikawa, Khonsue, Pomchote, and Matsui, 2013
Tylototriton verrucosus Anderson, 1871
Tylototriton vietnamensis Böhme, Schöttler, Nguyen, and Köhler, 2005
Tylototriton wenxianensis Fei, Ye, and Yang, 1984
Tylototriton yangi Hou, Zhang, Zhou, Li, and Lu, 2012
Tylototriton ziegleri Nishikawa, Matsui, and Nguyen, 2013

Phylogeny
The following phylogeny of Tylototriton is from Nishikawa, Matsui & Rao (2014).

References

External links

Tylototriton at CalPhotos

  
Amphibians of Asia
Amphibian genera
Taxa named by John Anderson (zoologist)